Marcel Trudov (born 31 August 1984) is a Moldovan judoka.

Achievements

References

External links
 

1984 births
Living people
Moldovan male judoka
21st-century Moldovan people